Maccabi Brinkford Tbilisi is the Georgian professional basketball club, that is based in Tbilisi, Georgia. The club competes in the Georgian Super Liga.

External links
Eurobasket.com Team Profile

Basketball teams in Georgia (country)
Tbilisi